Owen Edward Brennan Sr. (April 5, 1910 – November 4, 1955), was a restaurateur in his native New Orleans, Louisiana. In 1946 he founded the original Owen Brennan's Vieux Carre Restaurant on Bourbon St. Owen relocated his operations to 417 Royal St. The Royal St restaurant would soon be known as "Brennan's Restaurant," and opened shortly after Owen's sudden death in 1955.

Biography

Brennan was born to Owen Patrick Brennan (1886-1958) and the former Nellie Valentine. As the oldest of six children, Brennan felt the need to support his family from a young age. He and his wife, Maude, had three sons, Owen Jr., James, and Theodore. Determined to do well for himself, Brennan in 1943 purchased the Old Absinthe House on Bourbon Street. He became well known throughout the city as a host to his customers. Spurred by a challenge from a friend, Brennan in July 1946 opened Owen Brennan's French & Creole Restaurant, which became more commonly known as the Vieux Carre.

Brennan employed members of his family for different positions within the business. The restaurant flourished as it gained many regular customers. The dish Bananas Foster was created at his restaurant.
In 1954, however, when it became time for Brennan to renew his lease, his landlord demanded 50 percent of the profit from the restaurant. Unwilling to let that happen, Owen moved his restaurant to Royal street and converted an old building into the new and improved Brennan's Restaurant. Unfortunately Brennan did not see his restaurant open to the public. He died in his sleep on November 4, 1955, from a massive heart attack at the age of forty-five. The restaurant opened the following spring.

Along with being a successful restaurant owner, Owen Brennan also was the founding father of the Krewe of Bacchus, which he launched in 1949. Brennan had realized that many of his clients were unhappy tourists coming for Mardi Gras because at the time most of the Carnival balls were closed to anyone outside of the city's society circles. To appeal to the many tourists who came to the city he created a brand new Krewe. He even held two Bacchus Carnival balls, one in 1949, the other in 1950. Upon the death of Brennan Sr., his son Owen "Pip" Brennan Jr. (born 1934), took over the Krewe in 1968 and worked with his uncle who was only three years his senior, restaurateur Richard Brennan Sr., to restore life to the New Orleans Carnival. On February 16, 1969, the Krewe of Bacchus staged its first Mardi Gras parade.

References

1910 births
1955 deaths
Businesspeople from New Orleans
American restaurateurs
Louisiana cuisine
20th-century American businesspeople